The Kawasaki Ninja 300, or EX300, is a   Ninja series sport bike introduced by Kawasaki in 2012 for the 2013 model year. It is sold in Asia, Australia, Europe, and North America. When introduced, the Ninja 300R replaced the Ninja 250R in some markets, and in others they were sold alongside each other. When the 2018 model year Ninja 400 was introduced, it replaced the 300 in some markets.

Design 
The Ninja 300 is based on the Ninja 250R, a lightweight and inexpensive sport bike in production for over three decades. Like the Ninja 250R, it has a full fairing, but a wider rear tire, 140/70, instead of the 130/70 on the 250R. The Ninja 300 also has 5 spoke wheels, neutral finder, and optional antilock braking system (ABS). By comparison with the 250R, the Ninja 300 also has a slightly smaller fuel tank, taller gearing, and a back-torque-limiting slipper clutch with an assist mechanism that decreases clutch lever effort. Despite being a sport bike, it has comfortable ergonomics (such as windscreen effectively protecting from wind blast) which promotes commuting.

Performance 
The Ninja 300 has a  straight-twin engine.

Rivals 
The Ninja 300 competes with (and is commonly compared with) other entry-level (300/250 cc) bikes such as Yamaha R3, KTM RC390, Suzuki GSXR-250 and Honda CBR300R.

Replacement 
In an effort to increase its compliance with Euro IV, Kawasaki released the Ninja 400 which replaced the Ninja 300 in most markets.

2022 Update 
In 2022, the bike was released with new decals.

References

External links 

 

Ninja 300
Sport bikes
Motorcycles introduced in 2012
Motorcycles powered by straight-twin engines